ASC Assaba is a Mauritanian football club based in Kiffa the capital of Assaba Region. The club plays in the Mauritanean Premier League.

Stadium
Currently the team plays at the 40000 capacity Stade Olympique (Nouakchott).

References

External links
Soccerway

Football clubs in Mauritania